

Events calendar

+11